Egon Schwelb (1899–1979) was a Czech jurist.

Works

References

1899 births
1979 deaths
United Nations officials
Czech jurists